This article describes the group stage of the 2019–20 Women's EHF Cup, a women's handball competition.

Draw
The draw of the Women's EHF Cup group stage will take place on Thursday, 22 November 2019. The 16 teams allocated into four pots will be drawn into four groups of four teams.

Seedings
The seedings were announced on 18 November 2019:

Format
In each group, teams played against each other in a double round-robin format, with home and away matches. After completion of the group stage matches, the top two teams advanced to the Quarter-finals. Teams are not able to face opponents from the same country in the group.

Tiebreakers
In the group stage, teams were ranked according to points (2 points for a win, 1 point for a draw, 0 points for a loss). After completion of the group stage, if two or more teams had scored the same number of points, the ranking will be determined as follows:

Highest number of points in matches between the teams directly involved;
Superior goal difference in matches between the teams directly involved;
Highest number of goals scored in matches between the teams directly involved (or in the away match in case of a two-team tie);
Superior goal difference in all matches of the group;
Highest number of plus goals in all matches of the group;
If the ranking of one of these teams is determined, the above criteria are consecutively followed until the ranking of all teams is determined. If no ranking can be determined, a decision shall be obtained by EHF through drawing of lots.

Groups
The matchdays were 4–5 January, 11–12 January, 18–19 January, 25–26 January, 1–2 February and 8–9 February 2020.

Group A

Group B

Group C

Group D

References

group stage